Magniflex was an Italian professional cycling team that existed from 1973 to 1981, and in 1986 and  1987. Its main sponsor was Italian mattress manufacturer Magniflex. The team's major victory was Pierino Gavazzi's win of the 1980 Milan–San Remo.

References

External links

Cycling teams based in Italy
Defunct cycling teams based in Italy
1973 establishments in Italy
1987 disestablishments in Italy
Cycling teams established in 1973
Cycling teams disestablished in 1987